Downtown: A Street Tale is a 2004 American drama film.

Its focus is on a group of teenagers and twentysomethings living in the basement of an abandoned factory on 10th Avenue in Manhattan. Their leader is ex-junkie and hustler Angelo (aka Kick), who serves as a father figure to the motley crew that includes gay African American hairdresser Lamont; mentally challenged Hispanic Tito; Latina stripper Ashley; upper class drug addict Hunter; Romanian prostitute Raquel; and newly arrived from Texas rock star-wannabe Billy and his pregnant girlfriend Cheri. Added to the mix are social worker Aimee Levesque, who operates the fictional shelter Haven House (based on the real-life Covenant House) and keeps an eye on Angelo and his street kids; and a pornographer, a strip-club owner, and a wheelchair-using drug dealer. Their stories are told in a series of vignettes unfolding in the days just prior to Christmas.

The melodramatic independent film, written and produced by Joey Dedio (who also stars as Angelo) and directed by Rafal Zielinski. In addition to Dedio, the cast of the Slowhand Cinema release includes Jeremy Alan Richards as Lamont, Johnny Sanchez as Tito, Rachel Vasquez as Ashley, Chad Allen as Hunter, Mihaela Tudorof as Raquel, James Ransone as Billy, Domenica Cameron Scorsese as Cheri, Geneviève Bujold as Aimee, Burt Young as the pornographer, Lillo Brancato Jr. as the strip-club owner, and John Savage as the drug dealer.

The film had its world premiere at the AFI Film Festival on November 7, 2004. Following limited releases in New York City and Los Angeles in 2007, it was screened twice at the Cannes Film Festival in May.

Plot summary

Cast
 Joey Dedio as Angelo
 Eliud Figueroa as Guy in the street
 Geneviève Bujold as Aimee Levesque
 John Savage as H2O
 Burt Young as Gus

The soundtrack, available on AJM Records, includes a jazz-infused rendition of the Petula Clark classic "Downtown" by Irene Cara and "Children of Color" performed by Clark. This was the last film to be scored by composer Robert O. Ragland.

The movie was Line Produced by Daniel Sollinger

References

External links
 
 
 MySpace page
 New York Times review
 Los Angeles Times review

2004 films
2004 drama films
Films directed by Rafal Zielinski
Films set in New York City
Films scored by Robert O. Ragland
American independent films
American drama films
2000s American films